Swan 37 is a GRP constructed, fin keeled, one tonner masthead sloop and successor to the Swan 36. It was designed by Sparkman & Stephens and manufactured by Nautor Oy between 1970 and 1974 with total of 59 boats being built. Sparkman & Stephens designed the Americas Cup winner Intrepid (1967 and 1970) with a trim tab on the trailing edge of the keel. S&S used the same trim tab on at least some of the early Swan 37s.  Measured by racing success, Swan 37 is one of the most successful Swan yachts ever built and it is famous for winning the Round Gotland Race on six occasions in four decades by a yacht called Tarantella II. At least two Swan 37 boats Dulcinea and Trishna are known to have circumnavigated the world. As part of that circumnavigation, Dulcinea participated in the Cape to Rio race in 1976.  She is still actively sailed under the same name (as of 2017) in the US.  In the US market Swan 37 was also marketed as Palmer Johnson 37.

See also
 Trishna (yacht) Swan 37-109

References

Keelboats
Sailing yachts
1970s sailboat type designs
Sailboat types built by Nautor Swan
Sailboat type designs by Olin Stephens
Sailboat type designs by Sparkman and Stephens